The 2023 Canberra Raiders season is the 42nd in the club's history. They will compete in the National Rugby League's 2023 Telstra Premiership. The Co-captain Jarrod Croker retains his club role for the 10th consecutive season and other Co-captain Elliot Whitehead retains his co-captaincy for his 5th consecutive season. While Head Coach Ricky Stuart maintains his club position for the 10th consecutive season.

Player Movement
These movements happened across the previous season, off-season and pre-season.

Gains

Losses

Pre-Season Challenge

Regular Season

2023 squad

References

Canberra Raiders seasons
Canberra Raiders season
2023 NRL Women's season